Edmilson Santana (born 7 February 1987) is a male Brazilian long-distance runner. He competed in the marathon event at the 2015 World Championships in Athletics in Beijing, China, but did not finish.

See also
 Brazil at the 2015 World Championships in Athletics

References

Living people
Place of birth missing (living people)
1987 births
Brazilian male long-distance runners
World Athletics Championships athletes for Brazil